John H. Eastwood (May 12, 1911 – February 13, 2007) was an author, seminary professor, army chaplain, and church pastor in the United States.  He grew up in rural Nebraska and earned a Doctor of Divinity from Princeton Theological Seminary in 1941.  He served in the United States Army 464th Bombardment Group during World War II, starting at Herington Army Airfield and later in Italy.   His final position was as the pastor of Covenant Presbyterian Church in Hammond, Indiana, a church that he led to triple in size during his leadership.

"Our future is made sacred by their sacrifice."--Chaplain John H. Eastwood to the 464th's surviving airmen just after V-E Day 1945

Airman's prayer
Eastwood delivered (and likely wrote) before every mission what became known as the "Airman's Prayer".  In 1943, several of these verses were added to the Navy Hymn.

God guard and guide us as we fly
Through the great spaces of the sky;
Be with us as we take to air
In morning light and sunshine fair.
Eternal Father, strong to save,
Give us courage and make us brave;
Protect us whereso'er we go,
From shell and flak and fire and foe.
Most loved member of our crew.
Ride with us up in the blue.
Direct our bombs upon the foe
But shelter those whom Thou dost know.
Keep us together on our way,
Grant our work success today.
Deliver us from hate and sin,
And bring us safely down again.
O God protect us as we fly
Through lonely ways across the sky.

Bibliography
Eastwood published at least four books during his lifetime, all related to Christianity and Christian counseling.

References 

American Presbyterian ministers
United States Army chaplains
People from Hammond, Indiana
People from Pawnee County, Nebraska
United States Army Air Forces personnel of World War II
World War II chaplains
1911 births
2007 deaths
Tarkio Owls football players
Tarkio College alumni
20th-century American clergy